The gadfly, a type of fly plaguing cattle, appears in Greek mythology as a tormenter of Pegasus and Io, a human lover of Zeus.

In the story, Zeus lusted Io, who is eventually turned into a white heifer to hide her from his jealous wife, Hera. This goddess is not fooled, and demands Io as a gift from Zeus. She then assigns Argus, the 100-eyed giant, the job of guarding Io. Hermes, following orders of Zeus, kills Argus and frees Io. When Hera finds out, she sends a gadfly to torment and sting Io, forcing her to wander farther and farther away from home.

The gadfly plays a role in the myth of how Bellerophon loses Pegasus and the gods' favor. Bellerophon attempts to ride Pegasus to the top of Mt. Olympus, arrogantly believing himself worthy of entering the realm of the gods. Zeus is enraged by the human's audacity and sends a gadfly to sting Pegasus. The winged horse is startled and he rears backward. Bellerophon loses his grip and falls back to Earth. Athena spares his life by causing him to land on soft ground, but he becomes blind and wanders the earth alone until he dies, hated by both men and gods.

See also
 List of Greek mythological creatures

References

Animals in mythology
Characters in Greek mythology